Union Express is a charter airline based in Myanmar.

History
In May 2014, Union Express Charter Airline was announced as a start-up airline to offer charter flights from Myeik, Myanmar (Myeik Airport) to Bangkok (Suvarnabhumi Airport) using a Boeing 737 Next Generation aircraft on twice weekly flights from mid-2014. It is a joint venture between Myanmar Union Express Aviation Group and Myeik Public Corporation.

Fleet

References

Airlines of Myanmar
Airlines established in 2014
2014 establishments in Myanmar
Charter airlines